USS Narwhal has been the name of more than one United States Navy ship, and may refer to:

 USS Narwhal, a submarine renamed  in 1911, in commission from 1909 to 1922
 , a submarine in commission from 1930 to 1945, named USS V-1 (SS-167) from 1930 to 1931
 , a submarine in commission from 1969 to 1999

United States Navy ship names